Rabisha Rocks, Greenwich Island
 Rachenitsa Nunatak, Alexander Island  
 Radev Point, Rugged Island  
 Radibosh Point, Davis Coast  
 Radichkov Peak, Livingston Island  
 Radko Knoll, Livingston Island  
 Radnevo Peak, Livingston Island  
 Radomir Knoll, Livingston Island
 Mount Radotina, Graham Coast
 Radovene Point, Oscar II Coast  
 Radoy Ralin Peak, Livingston Island 
 Raduil Point, Astrolabe Island 
 Rak Island, Wilhelm Archipelago
 Raketa Island, Wilhelm Archipelago
 Raklitsa Island, Liège Island 
 Rakovski Nunatak, Livingston Island
 Ralida Island, Trinity Island
 Ralitsa Glacier, Brabant Island
 Ramsden Rock, Livingston Island
 Ranuli Ice Piedmont, Sentinel Range 
 Ranyari Point, Oscar II Coast
 Raskuporis Cove, Livingston Island 
 Rasnik Peak, Graham Coast
 Ravda Peak, Livingston Island 
 Raven Peninsula, Nordenskjöld Coast 
 Ravnogor Peak, Oscar II Coast
 Ravulya Nunatak, Sentinel Range
 Rayko Nunatak, Trinity Peninsula  
 Rayna Knyaginya Peak, Livingston Island
 Razboyna Glacier, Sentinel Range
 Razdel Point, Smith Island  
 Razgrad Peak, Greenwich Island 
 Razhana Buttress, Danco Coast
 Razlog Cove, Greenwich Island 
 Razvigor Peak, Trinity Peninsula  
 Rebrovo Point, Snow Island
 Redina Island, Robert Island 
 Regianum Peak, Brabant Island 
 Relyovo Peninsula, Danco Coast
 Remetalk Point, Livingston Island 
 Reselets Peak, Oscar II Coast 
 Retamales Point, Nelson Island
 Retizhe Cove, Trinity Peninsula  
 Revolver Island, Wilhelm Archipelago
 Rezen Knoll, Livingston Island  
 Rezen Saddle, Livingston Island  
 Rezovski Creek, Livingston Island  
 Rhesus Glacier, Anvers Island 
 Ribnik Island, Biscoe Islands 
 Riggs Peak, Smith Island  
 Riksa Islands, Aitcho Islands  
 Rila Point, Livingston Island  
 Rilets Peak, Oscar II Coast
 Rish Point, Livingston Island  
 Risimina Glacier, Nordenskjöld Coast
 Ritchie Rock, Snow Island
 Ritli Hill, Livingston Island 
 Ritya Glacier, Smith Island
 Robinson Pass, Sentinel Range 
 Roché Glacier, Vinson Massif  
 Rodopi Peak, Livingston Island  
 Rog Island, Wilhelm Archipelago
 Rogach Peak, Astrolabe Island 
 Rogosh Glacier, Oscar II Coast 
 Rogozen Island, Robert Island 
 Rogulyat Island, Trinity Island 
 Roman Knoll, Trinity Peninsula  
 Ronalds Point, Elephant Island
 Rongel Point, Livingston Island  
 Rongel Reef, Livingston Island  
 Ropotamo Glacier, Livingston Island  
 Rose Valley Glacier, Livingston Island 
 Rotalia Island, Nelson Island
 Royak Point, Trinity Peninsula 
 Roygos Ridge, Graham Coast
 Rozhen Peninsula, Livingston Island  
 Rudozem Heights, Fallières Coast  
 Ruen Icefall, Livingston Island  
 Rumyana Glacier, Sentinel Range  
 Rupite Glacier, Smith Island  
 Rusalka Glacier, Graham Coast  
 Ruse Peak, Livingston Island  
 Ruset Peak, Sentinel Range  
 Rusokastro Rock, Greenwich Island

See also 
 Bulgarian toponyms in Antarctica

External links 
 Bulgarian Antarctic Gazetteer
 SCAR Composite Gazetteer of Antarctica
 Antarctic Digital Database (ADD). Scale 1:250000 topographic map of Antarctica with place-name search.
 L. Ivanov. Bulgarian toponymic presence in Antarctica. Polar Week at the National Museum of Natural History in Sofia, 2–6 December 2019

Bibliography 
 J. Stewart. Antarctica: An Encyclopedia. Jefferson, N.C. and London: McFarland, 2011. 1771 pp.  
 L. Ivanov. Bulgarian Names in Antarctica. Sofia: Manfred Wörner Foundation, 2021. Second edition. 539 pp.  (in Bulgarian)
 G. Bakardzhieva. Bulgarian toponyms in Antarctica. Paisiy Hilendarski University of Plovdiv: Research Papers. Vol. 56, Book 1, Part A, 2018 – Languages and Literature, pp. 104-119 (in Bulgarian)
 L. Ivanov and N. Ivanova. Bulgarian names. In: The World of Antarctica. Generis Publishing, 2022. pp. 114-115. 

Antarctica
 
Bulgarian toponyms in Antarctica
Names of places in Antarctica